The 2015 Wilde Lexus Women's USTA Pro Circuit Event was a professional tennis tournament played on outdoor clay courts. It was the seventh edition of the tournament which was part of the 2015 ITF Women's Circuit, offering a total of $50,000 in prize money. It took place in Osprey, Florida, United States, on 30 March–5 April 2015.

Women's singles entrants

Seeds 

 1 Rankings as of 23 March 2015

Other entrants 
The following players received wildcards into the singles main draw:
  Samantha Crawford
  Alexa Glatch
  Kateřina Kramperová

The following players received entry from the qualifying draw:
  María Irigoyen
  Naomi Osaka
  Arantxa Rus
  İpek Soylu

The following player received entry by a lucky loser spot:
  Anhelina Kalinina

The following player received entry by a junior exempt:
  Darya Kasatkina

Champions

Singles 

  Alexa Glatch def.  Madison Brengle, 6–2, 6–7(6–8), 6–3

Doubles 

  Anhelina Kalinina /  Oleksandra Korashvili def.  Verónica Cepede Royg /  María Irigoyen, 6–1, 6–4

External links 
 2015 Wilde Lexus Women's USTA Pro Circuit Event at ITFtennis.com
 Official website

2015 ITF Women's Circuit
2015 in American sports